SS Sauternes was a steamship built in 1922. It was known as the Jólaskipið (the Christmas Ship) in the Faroe Islands. It sank in a storm in the firth Fugloyarfjørður within the Faroe Islands on 7 December 1941; all 25 passengers and crew were lost. The bodies of five of the service personnel who died are buried in Klaksvík old cemetery.

In addition to general cargo for the British garrison in the Faroes, Sauternes was also carrying 22,500 Danish kroner minted in the United Kingdom for use by the Faroese, since Denmark had been occupied by the Germans and was not sending any currency.

External links
 

 

History of the Faroe Islands
World War II merchant ships of the United Kingdom
World War II shipwrecks in the Atlantic Ocean
Steamships of France
Steamships of the United Kingdom
Merchant ships of France
Maritime incidents in December 1941
Shipwrecks of the Faroe Islands
Ships built in France
1922 ships